Damian Jones may refer to:

Damian Jones (basketball) (born 1995), American basketball player
Damian Jones (producer) (born 1964), British film producer

See also
Damon Jones (disambiguation)